The 1959 NCAA University Division football season saw Syracuse University crowned as the national champion by both final polls, the AP writers poll and the UPI coaches polls.

This width remained in effect for 32 seasons, until the 1991 season, when it was returned to 18½ feet.
During the 20th century, the NCAA had no playoff for the major college football teams in the University Division, later known as  The NCAA did recognize a national champion based upon the final results of "wire service" (AP and UPI) polls.  The extent of that recognition came in the form of acknowledgment in the annual NCAA Football Guide of the "unofficial" national champions.  The AP poll in 1959 consisted of the votes of as many as 201 sportswriters.  Though not all writers voted in every poll, each would give their opinion of the twenty best teams.  Under a point system of 20 points for first place, 19 for second, etc., the "overall" ranking was determined.  Although the rankings were based on the collective opinion of the representative sportswriters, the teams that remained "unbeaten and untied" were generally ranked higher than those that had not.  A defeat, even against a strong opponent, tended to cause a team to drop in the rankings, and a team with two or more defeats was unlikely to remain in the Top 20.  The top teams played on New Year's Day in the four major postseason bowl games: the Rose Bowl (near Los Angeles at Pasadena), the Sugar Bowl (New Orleans), the Orange Bowl (Miami), and the Cotton Bowl (Dallas).

Conference and program changes

Conference changes
One conference began play in 1959:
 Athletic Association of Western Universities – predecessor to the modern Pac-12 Conference; founded by five members (California, Stanford, USC, UCLA, and Washington) of the Pacific Coast Conference, which had disbanded in June. The remaining four (Idaho, Oregon, Oregon State, and Washington State) became independents; Washington State joined in 1962, followed by Oregon and Oregon State in 1964.
Two conferences played their final seasons in 1959:
 Alabama Intercollegiate Conference – active since the 1938 season; replaced by the Alabama Collegiate Conference in 1960
 Eastern Intercollegiate Conference – active since the 1953 season

Membership changes

September
In the preseason poll released on September 14, the defending champion LSU Tigers were ranked first, followed by Oklahoma, Auburn, SMU, and Army.  With more than 100 sportswriters weighing in, eighteen different schools received first place votes.  Syracuse was ranked No. 20 overall.  As the regular season progressed, a new poll would be issued on the Monday following the weekend's games.

On September 19, No. 1 LSU beat Rice at home, 26–3.  Oklahoma, Auburn, SMU, and Army had not yet opened their seasons; SMU and Army fell to 6th and 7th.  No. 8 Mississippi, which won 16–0 at Houston, rose to 4th in the next poll. No. 18 Clemson moved up to 5th after its 20–18 win at No. 12 North Carolina.  Three of the Top Five schools were from the SEC: No. 1 LSU, No. 2 Oklahoma, No. 3 Auburn, No. 4 Mississippi, and No. 5 Clemson

September 26 No. 1 LSU beat No. 9 TCU at home, 10–0.  No. 2 Oklahoma lost its opener, falling 45–13 at No. 10 Northwestern, and dropped out of the Top 20 entirely, while Northwestern took its place.  No. 3 Auburn lost at Tennessee 3–0 and fell to 17th place in the next poll. No. 4 Mississippi recorded another 16–0 win, this time at Kentucky, and rose to third.  No. 5 Clemson won at 47–0 at Virginia, but fell to 6th.  No. 7 Army returned to the Top 5 after its 44–8 win over Boston College.  No. 13 Iowa, which had won at California 42–12, rose to fifth.  The next poll was No. 1 LSU, No. 2 Northwestern, No. 3 Mississippi, No. 4 Army, and No. 5 Iowa.

October
October 3 No. 1 LSU and Baylor met at a game in Shreveport, with LSU winning 22–0. No. 2 Northwestern won at No. 5 Iowa, 14–10. No. 3 Mississippi registered a third shutout, beating Memphis State 43–0, but fell to fifth.  No. 4 Army lost at Illinois, 20–14, and fell out of the Top 20 completely.  No. 7 Georgia Tech which went to 3–0 after a 16–6 win over No. 6 Clemson, rose to 3rd in the poll. No. 10 Texas rose to fourth after its third shutout in a row, a 33–0 walloping of California.  The poll was: No. 1 LSU, No. 2 Northwestern, No. 3 Georgia Tech, No. 4 Texas, and No. 5 Mississippi.

October 10 No. 1 LSU beat the visiting Miami Hurricanes 27–3. No. 2 Northwestern beat Minnesota 6–0.  No. 3 Georgia Tech won at No. 8 Tennessee, 14–7.  In Dallas, No. 4 Texas defeated No. 13 Oklahoma 19–12.  No. 5 Mississippi won at Vanderbilt, 33–0.  In four games, Ole Miss was 4–0 and had outscored its opponents 108–0.  The next poll was: No. 1 LSU, No. 2 Northwestern, No. 3 Texas, No. 4 Georgia Tech, and No. 5 Mississippi.

On October 17, No. 1 LSU won at Kentucky, 9–0. No. 2 Northwestern won at Michigan 20–7. No. 3 Texas narrowly beat No. 12 Arkansas 13–12 in Little Rock.  No. 4 Georgia Tech lost to No. 11 Auburn, 7–6. No. 5 Mississippi yielded some points for the first time in the season, but beat Tulane 53–7.  The No. 7 USC Trojans rose to 5th after beating No. 18 Washington in Seattle, 22–15.  The next poll was: No. 1 LSU, No. 2 Northwestern, No. 3 Texas, No. 4 Mississippi, and No. 5 USC.

October 24 No. 1 LSU recorded its fourth shutout, winning 9–0 in Florida. No. 2 Northwestern killed another giant on the road, beating Notre Dame 30–24. No. 3 Texas defeated Rice 28–6. No. 4 Mississippi shut out No. 10 Arkansas 28–0 at Memphis. The No. 5 USC Trojans got past Stanford 30–28 and fell to 6th.  Taking USC's place was No. 6 Syracuse, which had beaten West Virginia 44–0 to reach the 5–0 mark.  The next poll was:  No. 1 LSU, No. 2 Northwestern, No. 3 Mississippi, No. 4 Texas, and No. 5 Syracuse.

October 31 No. 1 LSU and No. 3 Mississippi, both 6–0, met in Baton Rouge and both schools had great defenses.  LSU had outscored its opposition 103–6, while Ole Miss had a 189–7 point differential over all comers.  Someone had to lose, and Ole Miss fell to LSU 7–3. Billy Cannon returned a Jake Gibbs punt 89 yards for the game's only touchdown, but the Rebels had a chance to win the game when it drove to the LSU 1–yard line in the closing seconds, only to see third-string quarterback Doug Elmore stopped cold on fourth and goal by Cannon. No. 2 Northwestern beat visiting Indiana 30–13.  No. 4 Texas beat SMU in Dallas, 21–0.  No. 5 Syracuse won at Pittsburgh, 35–0, and rose to fourth.  The next poll was: No. 1 LSU, No. 2 Northwestern, No. 3 Texas, No. 4 Syracuse, and No. 5 Mississippi.

November
November 7  No. 1 LSU traveled to Knoxville to face No. 13 Tennessee, and gave up a touchdown for the first time in the season.  The Vols made it to the end zone twice, winning 14–13 over the Tigers.  Losing also was No. 2 Northwestern, which fell to visiting No. 9 Wisconsin, 24–19, and dropped to 6th. Northwestern would close the season on a three-game losing streak after a 6-0 start. No. 3 Texas won a close one over Baylor, 13–12, and rose to 2nd. No. 4 Syracuse, which had won at No. 7 Penn State 20–18, was catapulted to the No. 1 spot.  No. 5 Mississippi crushed UT-Chattanooga 58–0.  No. 6 USC returned to the Top Five after a 36–0 win over West Virginia.  The next poll was No. 1 Syracuse, No. 2 Texas, No. 3 LSU, No. 4 USC, and No. 5 Mississippi.

November 14 No. 1 Syracuse exercised its top status, brushing off overmatched Colgate 71–0.  No. 2 Texas lost to No. 18 TCU, 14–9, and No. 3 LSU returned to its winning ways, beating Mississippi State at home, 27–0. No. 4 USC beat Baylor 17–8. No. 5 Mississippi beat No. 9 Tennessee in Memphis, 37–7.  The poll changed slightly: No. 1 Syracuse, No. 2 Mississippi, No. 3 LSU, No. 4 USC, and No. 5 Texas.

November 21 No. 1 Syracuse won at Boston University, 46–0, for its fifth shutout as it reached the 9–0 mark. No. 3 LSU beat Tulane 14–6, then accepted an invitation to play in the Sugar Bowl.  No. 4 USC lost to rival UCLA, 10–3 and fell to 7th.  No. 9 Wisconsin, which closed its season and clinched the Big Ten title with an 11–7 win at Minnesota, rose to 5th. No. 2 Mississippi and No. 5 Texas were idle. The next poll: No. 1 Syracuse, No. 2 Mississippi, No. 3 LSU, No. 4 Texas, and No. 5 Wisconsin.

On Thanksgiving Day, No. 4 Texas won 20–17 at Texas A&M. No. 1 Syracuse was idle as it prepared for its December 5 trip to Los Angeles to play UCLA.  On Saturday, November 28, No. 2 Mississippi played its season ender against Mississippi State, in Starkville, and won 42–0.  Both LSU and Ole Miss were invited to a rematch in New Orleans at the Sugar Bowl.  A third SEC team, the No. 6 Georgia Bulldogs, beat Georgia Tech 21–14 in Atlanta and accepted a spot in the Orange Bowl.  Because Oklahoma had played in the Orange Bowl the year before, a "no repeat" rule gave the Big 7 (Oklahoma State would join later) berth to 6–4 Missouri.  The Rose Bowl matched No. 6 Wisconsin against No. 8 Washington.  The penultimate poll was No. 1 Syracuse, No. 2 Mississippi, No. 3 LSU, No. 4 Texas, and No. 5 Georgia.

On December 5, No. 1 Syracuse closed its season with trip to the Los Angeles Coliseum to face the upset-minded (but 5–3–1) No. 17 UCLA Bruins   In a nationally televised game, the Orangemen took a 14–0 lead and went on to win 36–8 to finish the season with a perfect 10–0 record.  As the only unbeaten team among universities, Syracuse was voted No. 1 in the AP Poll (with 134 of 201 first-place votes) and in the UPI Coaches Poll, with 31 of the 35 first-place votes. The Orangemen prepared to play SWC champion Texas in the Cotton Bowl.

Conference standings

Bowl games
Major bowlsFriday, January 1, 1960Behind future Heisman Trophy winner Ernie Davis, the Orangemen proved the voters' decision to name them national champions in the final polls was a wise one. It was the first Cotton Bowl for the Longhorns under coach Darrell Royal, who guided Texas to national championships in 1963, 1969, and 1970, and compiled a career record of 167–47–5 in Austin from 1957 through 1976.

Ole Miss systematically demolished LSU in the Sugar Bowl. LSU was Ole Miss's sole loss of the regular season. The Rebels outgained the Bayou Bengals and Heisman Trophy winner Billy Cannon 373–74 in front of a largely pro-LSU crowd of over 83,000 at Tulane Stadium. Immediately following the game, Cannon signed a contract with the Houston Oilers of the fledgling American Football League, spurning the Los Angeles Rams and general manager Pete Rozelle.

Other bowls

 Prior to the 1975 season, the Big Ten and AAWU (later Pac-8) conferences allowed only one postseason participant each, for the Rose Bowl.

Heisman Trophy votingThe Heisman Trophy is given to the year's most outstanding player''

Source:

See also
 1959 NCAA University Division football rankings
 1959 College Football All-America Team

References